William Smith (September 7, 1727May 14, 1803) was an Episcopal priest who served as the first provost of the College of Philadelphia, which became the University of Pennsylvania. He was also the founder of Washington College in Chestertown Maryland, and St. John's College in Annapolis, Maryland.

Biography

Smith was born in Aberdeen, Scotland, to Thomas and Elizabeth (Duncan) Smith. He attended the University of Aberdeen, later claiming a master's from the institution. He also held the degree of Doctor of Divinity from Aberdeen, the University of Oxford, and Trinity College, Dublin. In 1753, Smith wrote a pamphlet outlining his thoughts about education. The book fell into the hands of Benjamin Franklin and Richard Peters; as a result they asked Smith to come to Philadelphia and teach at the newly established college there (now the University of Pennsylvania).

In 1755 Smith became the first provost (the equivalent of the modern post of university president) of the school. He held the post until 1779. Smith was an Anglican priest and together with William Moore, Smith was briefly jailed in 1758 for his criticism of the military policy in the Quaker-run colony. Indeed, during the French and Indian War, Smith published two anti-Quaker pamphlets that advocated the disenfranchisement of all Quakers, who were the political elite in Pennsylvania. However, their pacifist beliefs made it difficult for the Quakers in government to provide funds for defense, and as a result anti-Quaker sentiment ran high, especially in the backcountry which suffered from frequent raids from Indians allied with the French. Smith's second pamphlet, A Brief View of the Conduct of Pennsylvania, For the Year 1755 (1756), actually went so far as to suggest that while one way of "ridding our Assembly of Quakers" would be to require an oath, "another way of getting rid of them" would be "by cutting their Throats." Smith's virulent attacks on Quakers alienated him from Franklin, who was closely allied with the Pennsylvania Assembly.

Smith courted and married Moore's daughter, Rebecca, and had seven children. Their grandson William Rudolph Smith became a politician who served in both the Pennsylvania and Wisconsin state legislatures.

Smith advocated for the Church of England to appoint a bishop in America, a highly controversial proposal insofar as many Americans feared any ecclesiastical institution that might compel compliance with the force of royal authority. Smith received honorary Doctor of Divinity degrees from the University of Oxford and the University of Aberdeen in 1759 and from Trinity College, Dublin in 1763. In 1768 he became a member of the American Philosophical Society.

Smith was also the founding editor of The American Magazine, or Monthly Chronicle for the British Colonies, the first publication of its kind, which appeared from October 1757 until October 1758, when publication ceased owing to Smith's incarceration due to the previously mentioned libel action initiated by the Pennsylvania Assembly.

Smith's best known work as an author is "Bouquet's Expedition Against the Ohio Indians in 1764" (1765), an account of the last campaign in Pontiac's War, led by Colonel Henry Bouquet.

When the American Revolution broke out, Smith was in a bind. As an Anglican priest, he was viewed as a Loyalist, but his sentiments were far more sympathetic towards the Patriots than otherwise, even to the point of founding a college named for George Washington, the commander-in-chief of the Patriot Continental Army, in the midst of war. He was appointed to serve on the Philadelphia Committee of Correspondence in 1774, along with such notables as John Dickinson, Samuel Miles, and Joseph Reed. Forced to leave Philadelphia, Smith moved to Maryland where helped found and become the first president of Washington College, an institution that he intended to be the premiere academic institution of the region; it received almost exclusive patronage from the first President of the United States, George Washington.

After the war, he returned to Philadelphia, where he briefly regained his post at Penn. His final project was the development of land in the western region of the state. Huntingdon, Pennsylvania, was founded by Rev. Smith, and his sons were the first leaders of its government.

Efforts for American Anglicanism

Selina Hastings, Countess of Huntingdon, was a patron of William Smith's and  had some unfortunate personal tragedies which motivated her interest in the spread of religion.  Incidentally, Smith named his real estate venture Huntingdon in her honor.  This was along the Juniata River, in central Pennsylvania. Lady Huntingdon was persuaded that the Church of England needed to return to the path of righteousness. The Wesleys (John Wesley, Charles Wesley) and George Whitefield whom she supported, in addition to Smith's interests, found it easier to work towards righteousness in the "low" church or what became called Methodism or the "Methodist Movement."

To further show the problems that the colonials had with the Church of England, William Smith, seemed to be right in the middle of things. The May 1, 1760 first free and voluntary Convention of the American (Anglican) Priesthood met at Christ Church, Philadelphia, Dr. Smith presiding. The attendees wanted and needed an American Episcopate (bishop). Smith worked towards that goal.

There was a very practical element here. To obtain more priests for work in the colonies, ordination of priests had to be done by a bishop. The bishop was in England. The trip to and from England in those days was risky. Many prospective priests and those recently ordained didn't survive the trip. Thus, there was a supply problem with priests in the colonies. The Bishop of London had superintendency of the colonies but was not going to do anything that would incur Royal disfavor.

Smith was having trouble getting the Privy Council in England to pay attention to his pleas for the King to approve the consecration of a bishop that would reside in the American colonies. Archbishop of Canterbury Secker also sensed that the time was not yet right. The King was the Head of the Church of England, the same King the Americans revolted against. A modern look back at this period indicates that King George III's "mental" illness of an inherited biochemical etiology (porphyria) was rather unpredictable and caused great havoc in the order of things.

No approval ever came for an American bishop before the Revolution. Afterwards, the American priests turned to the Scottish bishops to consecrate Rev. Samuel Seabury, the first American bishop of the Protestant Episcopal Church. This was always viewed as "almost proper."  Thus, perfection in this matter had to wait until things settled down in the post-Revolutionary era.

With all the political activity by Smith working for an American bishop on both sides of the Atlantic, the question obviously was why didn't Smith become elevated to that station? The reports handed down were that Rev. Dr. Smith was "too fond of the grape" to be worthy of such consecration.

Notes

References

External links

Biography and portrait at the University of Pennsylvania
William Smith Papers, University of Pennsylvania

1727 births
1803 deaths
18th-century American Episcopal priests
19th-century American Episcopal priests
Alumni of the University of Aberdeen
Clergy in the American Revolution
Clergy from Aberdeen
People of colonial Pennsylvania
Presidents of St. John's College
Presidents of Washington College
St. John's College (Annapolis/Santa Fe) faculty
Scottish emigrants to the United States
University and college founders
University of Pennsylvania faculty